The McLaren M5A was a racing car constructed by Bruce McLaren Motor Racing, and was McLaren's first purpose-built Formula One car. Like its M4B predecessor, only one car of this type was ever built. The car was the first to use the BRM type 101 3.0 litre V12 engine, which produced 365 bhp.

The M5A's first race was the rain-affected 1967 Canadian Grand Prix, and after an early spin McLaren worked his way up to fourth place, before a pit stop to change a flat battery caused by McLaren's decision not to use an alternator pushed him back down to seventh place at the end. At the next race in Italy McLaren qualified third, but broke two connecting rods while battling for fourth place and retired after 46 laps. The last two races of the season were no better, with McLaren retiring from both.

With McLaren missing the season-opening 1968 South African Grand Prix, reigning World Champion Denis Hulme took over the M5A, now painted orange rather than the original blood-red, and finished 2 laps adrift in fifth place.

Joakim Bonnier Racing Team

Swedish privateer Jo Bonnier bought the M5A to replace his ageing Cooper T81, and used it to take part in 7 more Grands Prix in 1968, as well as that year's Race of Champions, International Trophy and International Gold Cup meetings. His best result came in Italy, with sixth place, but by now it was clear that the car was becoming both unreliable and slow, so Bonnier retired the car and hung it on the wall of his art gallery.

The car was later repainted in its original colours and demonstrated in various historic races around the world. Sadly Sir Jack Brabham crashed the car heavily after a coming together with Jackie Oliver at the 1999 Goodwood Revival Meeting and had to be cut free from the car. The car has since been restored back to original condition.

Formula One World Championship results 
(key) (Results in bold indicate pole position; results in italics indicate fastest lap)

 This total includes points scored by the McLaren M4B used by McLaren earlier in the season.

Non-Championship results
(key) (results in bold indicate pole position; results in italics indicate fastest lap)

References

http://mclarenm5a.tripod.com/car.htm
https://web.archive.org/web/20070927213333/http://www.bruce-mclaren.com/the-cars/f1/m5a
https://web.archive.org/web/20070508152100/http://www.carguidemagazine.com/features/article/5534
http://www.forix.com/8w/bonnier.html
http://www.forix.com/car.php?l=0&r=1968000819&c=51&b=1000
http://www.forix.com/engine.php?l=0&r=1967000819&c=0
https://web.archive.org/web/20070929131650/http://forum.racesimcentral.com/showthread.php?t=26687

McLaren M05A
1967 Formula One season cars
1968 Formula One season cars